Robert M. Anderson may refer to:
 Robert M. Anderson (politician) (1824–1878), lieutenant governor of California
 Robert M. Anderson (mathematician) (born 1951)
 Robert Mailer Anderson (born 1968), American writer and philanthropist
 Robert Marshall Anderson (1933–2011), Minnesotan bishop